Raajayogam is a 1976 Indian Malayalam film,  directed by Hariharan. The film stars Prem Nazir, Jayabharathi, Adoor Bhasi and Muthukulam Raghavan Pillai in the lead roles. The film has musical score by M. S. Viswanathan.

Cast

Prem Nazir
Jayabharathi
Adoor Bhasi
Muthukulam Raghavan Pillai
Bahadoor
Junior Sheela
K. P. Ummer
Meena
Nellikode Bhaskaran
Vidhubala

Soundtrack
The music was composed by M. S. Viswanathan and the lyrics were written by Mankombu Gopalakrishnan.

References

External links
 

1976 films
1970s Malayalam-language films
Films scored by M. S. Viswanathan
Films directed by Hariharan